The 2012–13 G4S Korvpalli Meistriliiga was the 88th season of the Estonian basketball league and the fourth under the title sponsorship of G4S. Kalev/Cramo came into the season as defending champions of the 2011–12 KML season.

The season started on 10 October 2012 and concluded on 17 May 2013 with Kalev/Cramo defeating TÜ/Rock 4 games to 0 in the finals to win their 6th Estonian League title.

Teams

Regular season

Playoffs

Individual statistics
Players qualify to this category by having at least 50% games played.

Points

Rebounds

Assists

Awards

Finals MVP
  Tanel Sokk (Kalev/Cramo)

Best Defender
  Martin Dorbek (TYCO Rapla)

Best Young Player
  Rait-Riivo Laane (TYCO Rapla)

Coach of the Year
  Alar Varrak (Kalev/Cramo)

All-KML team

Player of the Month

See also
 2012–13 EuroChallenge
 2012–13 VTB United League
 2012–13 Baltic Basketball League

References

External links
Official website 

Korvpalli Meistriliiga seasons
Estonian
KML